The flag of Hertfordshire is the flag of the English county of Hertfordshire. The flag is a banner of the arms of Hertfordshire County Council.  On 19 November 2008 the Council passed a resolution that the design is a fitting and proper emblem for the county and its people. The council subsequently registered the banner of arms as the flag of the county with the Flag Institute and it now appears on the latter's registry of local flags.



Flag design
The blue and white wavy lines, a traditional heraldic representation of a water course, symbolise the county's many rivers while the shield and hart are taken from the arms of the Borough of Hertford. It is a heraldic pun of Hart and ford. The Hart reclines on a yellow field, representing Saint Alban, the patron saint of Hertfordshire and first British martyr, whose cross is traditionally yellow on blue.

The pantone colours for the flag are:
Blue 300
White
Yellow 116
Brown 70% 1405

References

Hertfirdshire
Hertfordshire
Hertfordshire
Hertfordshire